Yo Lee (born Lee You-ting on September 2, 1989) is a Taiwanese singer-songwriter.

Early life and education 
Lee was born on September 2, 1989, in New Taipei City, Taiwan. He graduated from Shih Hsin University.

Musical career 
Lee won Jungle Voice, a Taiwanese singing competition, in 2019. 
His debut album, If Only You Could Love Me, was released in 2020. In August 2021, his 2020 album was nominated for Best New Artist in the 32nd Golden Melody Awards.

Discography 

 Find Me (2018)
 If Only You Could Love Me (2020)

References

External links 
 

Living people
21st-century Taiwanese singers
1989 births
Taiwanese singers
People from New Taipei
Shih Hsin University alumni